Hveding is a surname. Notable people with the surname include:

Jacob Hveding, Norwegian lawyer
Vidkunn Hveding (1921–2001), Norwegian politician

Norwegian-language surnames